The University Film and Video Association (UFVA) is an organization of professors, scholars, and film and video makers. Although it is based in the U.S., it has members throughout the world.

Its stated description is:
The UFVA is an international organization where media production and writing meets the history, theory and criticism of the media. The UFVA members are image-makers and artists, teachers and students, archivists and distributors, college departments, libraries, and manufacturers.

UFVA holds an annual conference and publishes the Journal of Film and Video, a periodical featuring articles on film and video production, history, theory, criticism, and aesthetics. UFVA also administers the American Documentary Showcase.

History 
UFVA was founded in 1947 as the University Film Producers Association. Its name was changed to the University Film Association and later the University Film and Video Association.

Conference
The annual UFVA Conference is held each summer. Attendees screen films, present papers and panels, mount new media exhibits, and stage readings of un-produced screenplays.

Recent conference sites
2017 California State University Los Angeles
2016 University of Nevada Las Vegas
2015 American University
2014 Montana State University
2013 Chapman University
2012 Columbia College Chicago
2011 Emerson College
2010 Champlain College
2009 University of New Orleans
2008 Colorado College
2007 University of North Texas
2006 Chapman University
2005 Columbia College of Chicago
2004 University of Toledo
2003 University of South Carolina
2002 Ithaca College
2001 Kodak Headquarters
2000 Colorado College
1999 Emerson College
1998 North Carolina School of the Arts
1997 University of Wisconsin-Oshkosh
1996 Chapman University

References

External links

American film critics associations
Film organizations in the United States
Non-profit organizations based in the United States